Lemna minuta is a species of duckweed known by the common name least duckweed. It is the smallest Lemna species. It is native to parts of the Americas, and naturalized in others; the exact native range is not known. It is found on other continents as a non-native introduction as well. The plant's distribution is ever-expanding; it has been spreading in Europe and it was described from Poland for the first time in 2007. In many areas it is a noxious weed, such as in Belgium.

This tiny plant varies in shape depending on growth conditions. In the shade it is a single green translucent oval body no more than 2.5 millimeters long, and in full sunlight it generally grows in pairs. There is a central vein usually visible under magnification and microscopy. The plant produces an ephemeral membrane-bound flower.

This duckweed grows in slow-moving, calm, and stagnant freshwater habitats. It affects the ecology of its habitat by forming mats on the water surface, reducing sunlight penetration and oxygen exchange.

References

External links
Jepson Manual Treatment
Lemna Comparisons and L. minuta Species Description
Flora of North America

Lemnoideae
Freshwater plants
Flora of North America
Flora of South America
Plants described in 1816